"Wide Open Road" is a single released in 1986 by Australian rock band The Triffids from their album Born Sandy Devotional. It was produced by Gil Norton (Pixies, Echo & the Bunnymen, Foo Fighters) and written by David McComb on vocals, keyboards and guitar. The B-side "Time of Weakness" was recorded live at the Graphic Arts Club, Sydney, November 1985 by Mitch Jones, mixed by Rob Muir (in Perth). "Dear Miss Lonely Hearts" was recorded at Planet Sound Studios, Perth and produced by the Triffids. "Wide Open Road" reached No. 26 on the UK Singles Chart in 1986, and No. 64 on the Australian Kent Music Report Singles Chart. In May 2001 the Australasian Performing Right Association (APRA), as part of its 75th Anniversary celebrations, named "Wide Open Road" as one of the Top 30 Australian songs of all time.

In January 2018, as part of Triple M's "Ozzest 100", the 'most Australian' songs of all time, "Wide Open Road" was ranked number 64.

Background
The Triffids had toured Europe in 1985 and were based in London but they were unable to raise a major record deal and with a lack of finances, their second studio album Born Sandy Devotional was recorded there in August 1985 with Gil Norton producing (fresh from working with Echo & the Bunnymen). They released two versions of "Wide Open Road", a 7” version and a 12” version. The B-side, "Time of Weakness", was recorded live at the Graphic Arts Club, Sydney. The album reached No. 27 on the UK charts and the single peaked at No. 26 on the UK charts: while only reaching No. 64 on the Australian Kent Music Report Singles Chart. The song was written by David McComb, who described the process:

On 10 January 1987 The Triffids performed the track live at their home town, Perth's Subiaco Oval, as part of the Australian Made Tour by various artists. McComb introduced their performance: "... it's sorta hard to write the set list at the start of the day 'cos we've had so many hits in this country: it's difficult to know which hit to play. Where to start? But this one's been played on Countdown so I guess that means something..." In July that year a documentary film, Australian Made: The Movie, of the concert series, with The Triffids represented by "Wide Open Road", was released to Australian cinemas and later onto VHS (1988).

The song reached No. 68 on Triple J's Hottest 100 for 1989 and No. 49 in 1990 (from 1989 to 1991, voting was not restricted to songs released that year). Its success also resulted in the band's first appearance on Australia's popular weekly musical television show, Countdown.

Reviews
"Hauntingly simple in its sparse use of keyboards, clean, ringing guitars, and just the one, repeated drum fill, it has an epic majesty which is entirely suited to the semi-mythical Australia of The Triffids’ vision; no other song has so perfectly captured the sense of vast, uncharted expanses which characterises the Australia of our collective imagination."

"'Wide Open Road' is one of those songs that illustrates the stark reality of Australia’s barren, desolate landscape on many levels, emphasising it's often cruel geography and the realities that come from existing within it."

"The band uses silence and space to allow the lyrics and melody to resonate fully with the listener. While the song may be Australian in setting with its evocation of a vast, desert wasteland, it uses the Australian desert as a metaphor for the distance between people and for the sense of loss following a failed relationship."

Legacy
In May 2001 the Australasian Performing Right Association (APRA), as part of its 75th Anniversary celebrations, named "Wide Open Road" as one of the Top 30 Australian songs of all time.

Paul Kelly and The Saints' Chris Bailey performed "Wide Open Road" at the Mushroom 25th Anniversary concert in 1998, to ensure that one of Kelly's favourite songwriters was represented.

"Wide Open Road" was re-released as a CD single by Mushroom Records in 1998 as No. 16 in a series of 25 limited edition classic Mushroom singles. It was also re-released as a download only single by Domino Records to coincide with the re-release of Born Sandy Devotional in July 2006.

Cover versions of the song were also recorded by Weddings Parties Anything on their 1998 compilation album Trophy Night, and The Church on their 2007 acoustic album El Momento Siguiente. It was also covered by fellow Perth outfit The Panics for Triple J's segment, "Like a Version" in 2007.

At the band's induction into the ARIA Hall of Fame in July 2008, Steve Kilbey from The Church filled in for David McComb when The Triffids performed "Wide Open Road".

Track listing
All tracks written by David McComb.

Original release (7")
 "Wide Open Road" - 4:08
 "Time of Weakness" - 3:12

Original release (12")
 "Wide Open Road" - 4:08
 "Time of Weakness" (live) - 3:12
 "Dear Miss Lonely Hearts"
 "Native Bride" (live)

1989 Mushroom Records re-release
 "Wide Open Road"
 "Time of Weakness"

Personnel
The Triffids members
 Jill Birt — keyboards (track 1), hammond organ (track 3)
 Martyn P. Casey — bass (all tracks)
 Graham Lee — pedal steel guitar (track 1), lap steel guitar (track 2, 4)
 Alsy MacDonald — drums (track 1, 3), hi-hat (track 2, 4)
 David McComb — vocals (all tracks),  guitar (all tracks), keyboards (track 1)
 Robert McComb — guitar (all tracks), violin (track 3)

Additional musicians
 Adam Peters — piano, keyboards

Recording details
 Producer — Gil Norton
 Sequencer — MacDonald, (track 1), D McComb (track 1)
 Mixer — Rob Muir (track 2)
 Recording — Mitch Jones (track 2, live)
 Studio — Mark Angelo Studios, London (track 1), The Graphics Art Club, Sydney (track 2)
 Mixing studio — Amazon Studios, Liverpool (track 1)

Art work
 Photography  — Bleddyn Butcher (front cover), MacDonald (back cover), Mark Trengove (Domino 2006)

References

1986 singles
APRA Award winners
The Triffids songs
Mushroom Records singles
Domino Recording Company singles
1986 songs
Songs written by David McComb
Song recordings produced by Gil Norton
Songs about roads